Sarangpur is a city and tehsil in Rajgarh district in the Indian state of Madhya Pradesh. It is situated at the bank of the river Kali Sindh.

Sarangpur is a town in Sarangpur Tehsil in Rajgarh District of Madhya Pradesh, India. It belongs to Bhopal Division. It is located 65 km south of the District Headquarters Rajgarh. It is a tehsil headquarters. Sarangpur's PIN code is 465697 and postal head office is Sarangpur. 
Taleni (4 km), Taraganj (5 km), Tarlakhedi (5 km), Kachhikhedi (5 km), Balodi (6 km) are the nearby villages to Sarangpur. Sarangpur is surrounded by Sarangpur Tehsil to the north, Shajapur Tehsil to the south, Nalkheda Tehsil to the west, and Shujalpur Tehsil to the south. Sarangpur, Pachore, Shajapur, and Shujalpur are the nearby cities to Sarangpur. It is on the border of the Rajgarh District and Shajapur District. Shajapur District Moman Badodia is west of this area.

Geography
It has an average elevation of 410 metres (1345 feet).

History
Sarangpur is counted on the list of oldest historical places. Baz Bahadur and Rani Rupmati ruled the city; they were the rulers of Mandwa, Madhya Pradesh. The war between Baz Bahadur and Akbar the Great also occurred in Sarangpur. In that war, Akbar defeated Baz Bahadur and ruled the city. There was also a battle held at Sarangpur in which Rajput king Rana Kumbha of Mewar attacked Malwa sultan Mahmud Khalji who was joined by Ahmed Shah, the sultan of Gujarat, leading to Rajput victory over the Malwa Sultanate.
Sultan Mahmud Khilji was taken prisoner after this battle

Demographics

As of the 2011 Census of India, Sarangpur had a population of 37,435. Males constitute 52% of the population and females 48%. Sarangpur has an average literacy rate of 74.54%, higher than the national average of 69.32%: male literacy is 81.79%, and female literacy is 66.87%. In Sarangpur, 14.67% of the population is under six years of age.

Known for
 Baz Bahadur and Rani Rupmati Ka Maqbara: the symbol of their love is a famous tourist place in this town.
 Third-largest and biggest mosque in India (after Delhi and Bhopal mosque) is situated in Sarangpur and named Shahi Jama Masjid.
 Kapileshwar Mandir is an ancient temple situated in the middle of Kali Sindh River.
Shah Manjhan, medieval Islamic scholar

Transport
Bus service is available in Sarangpur. Sarangpur is served by Agra Mumbai Highway NH3. It is 126 km from Indore, the business capital of Madhya Pradesh. It is 160 km from Bhopal, the capital. Sarangpur railway station is situated on Indore–Gwalior line under the Bhopal railway division of West Central Railway zone.

References

Cities and towns in Rajgarh district
Rajgarh, Madhya Pradesh